Henry Mayer could refer to: 

Henry Mayer (cartoonist) (1868-1954), German cartoonist
Henry Mayer (historian), American historian
Heinz Meier (composer) (1925-1998), German composer who used the pseudonym "Henry Mayer"

See also
 Henry Maier (1918–1994), American politician and mayor of Milwaukee, Wisconsin
Heinz Meier (disambiguation)
Henry Meyer (disambiguation)